Tyler Zink (born January 30, 2001) is an American tennis player.

Zink won the 2019 US Open – Boys' doubles title with fellow American Eliot Spizzirri. Zink plays college tennis at Oklahoma State University.

Zink has won 2 ITF Futures Tour doubles tournaments. His career high ATP doubles ranking of 880 was achieved on 20 January 2020.

ATP Challenger and ITF Futures finals

Doubles: 9 (8–1)

Junior Grand Slam finals

Doubles: 1 (1 title)

References

External links

2001 births
Living people
American male tennis players
Sportspeople from Lancaster, Pennsylvania
Sportspeople from Bradenton, Florida
US Open (tennis) junior champions
Georgia Bulldogs tennis players
Oklahoma State Cowboys tennis players
Grand Slam (tennis) champions in boys' doubles
Tennis people from Pennsylvania